The Progressive Party of Manitoba fielded a number of candidates in the 1990 Manitoba provincial election, none of whom were elected.  Information about these candidates may be found on this page.

Candidates

Transcona: Thomas Bunn

Bunn received 168 votes (1.91%), finishing fourth against New Democratic Party candidate Daryl Reid.

Wellington: Neil Schipper

Neil Schipper is a research and development engineer.  He ran for the Progressive Party on two occasions, including a 1993 by-election.

Footnotes

Progressive Party of Manitoba (1981–1995) politicians